Youth Without Borders is a social project organized by students of the Pontifical Catholic University of Chile that was born in 2003. The project organizes volunteer summer and winter works for students of all the university's programs. Its final goal is raising awareness and social responsibility in participating students.

Youth Without Borders develops projects in remote and small localities (50 to 100 inhabitants) in Chile. Generally, the localities visited have no easy access, and do not have electricity, telephone signal or even drinking water. Each edition involves between 120 and 200 volunteers, distributed among 12 and 20 communities.

The project has 3 focuses of work: constructions, workshops and the Medical-Cultural Truck. Through these, it seeks to go beyond a purely material aid, and aims to relate each of the volunteers with the inhabitants of the localities, during the 2 weeks of the works.

In its 13 years of existence more than 1,500 volunteers have gone through the project, visiting a total of more than 150 localities in 28 communes of Chile. This has materialized thanks to the help of other institutions such as the Chilean Army, the Chilean Navy and the Chilean Air Force.

Pontifical Catholic University of Chile